Valentino Gallo (born 17 July 1985) is an Italian water polo player who competed in the 2008 Summer Olympics and 2012 Summer Olympics.  He was part of the silver medal-winning team at the 2012 Summer Olympics. He is currently playing with AN Brescia in Italy.

See also
 Italy men's Olympic water polo team records and statistics
 List of Olympic medalists in water polo (men)
 List of men's Olympic water polo tournament top goalscorers
 List of world champions in men's water polo
 List of World Aquatics Championships medalists in water polo

References

External links
 

1985 births
Living people
People from Syracuse, Sicily
Italian male water polo players
Water polo drivers
Left-handed water polo players
Water polo players at the 2008 Summer Olympics
Water polo players at the 2012 Summer Olympics
Water polo players at the 2016 Summer Olympics
Medalists at the 2012 Summer Olympics
Medalists at the 2016 Summer Olympics
Olympic silver medalists for Italy in water polo
Olympic bronze medalists for Italy in water polo
World Aquatics Championships medalists in water polo
Competitors at the 2013 Mediterranean Games
Competitors at the 2018 Mediterranean Games
Mediterranean Games competitors for Italy
Sportspeople from the Province of Syracuse